Sir Henry John Miller (9 September 1830 – 6 February 1918) was a New Zealand politician.

Biography
Miller was the second son of The Rev. Sir Thomas Combe Miller, 6th Baronet (see Miller Baronets) and his wife Martha Holmes, daughter of the Rev. Thomas Holmes, of Bungay, Suffolk. He was educated at Eton College and admitted to Trinity College, Cambridge on 8 July 1848. He rowed in the Cambridge eight in the second Boat Race of 1849 in December when Cambridge lost.

Miller went to New Zealand where he took up sheep farming and was involved in other commercial activities at Otago. He was a member of the provincial government of Otago from 1863 to 1864, a member of the New Zealand Legislative Council from 1865 to 1917, when he resigned. He was the Speaker of the Legislative Council from 1892 to 1903. He was knighted in 1901.

Miller married Jessie Orbell, daughter of John Orbell, of Hawkesbury, Otago on 15 December 1864.They had five sons and two daughters.

See also
List of Cambridge University Boat Race crews

Notes

References

1830 births
1918 deaths
Alumni of Trinity College, Cambridge
Cambridge University Boat Club rowers
Speakers of the New Zealand Legislative Council
People from Otago
Members of the New Zealand Legislative Council
New Zealand Knights Bachelor
People educated at Eton College
New Zealand farmers
Members of Otago provincial executive councils
English emigrants to New Zealand
New Zealand politicians awarded knighthoods